Shari Watson (born October 10, 1971, St. Louis, Missouri), known as Truth Hurts, is an American R&B singer, songwriter and actress.

Biography
In 2000, Watson signed to Dr. Dre's Aftermath Entertainment label. She first appeared on Busta Rhymes' 2001 hit single, "Break Ya Neck", as a backing vocalist.  In 2001, she played a small role in The Wash starring Dr. Dre and Snoop Dogg, as well as a cameo in the film Ali starring Will Smith. She also appeared as a background vocalist on the D12 song "Nasty Mind".  For her first solo LP, Truthfully Speaking, issued on Aftermath in 2002, Truth Hurts enlisted the production talents of Dr. Dre, Timbaland, Hi-Tek, and DJ Quik. Her debut single, "Addictive", was a Top 10 hit in the United States, and featured a verse from hip hop artist Rakim. The original song, Lata Mangeshkar's "Thoda Resham Lagta Hai", was used as the main base of the track within the chorus. The copyright holders sued Aftermath and parent company Interscope Records for $500 million, and issued an injunction against further sales or performances of the record. A judge later ruled that the album was not to be sold without being stickered with proper credits for Mangeshkar.

In summer of 2002, Truth Hurts secured a spot on the Smokin' Grooves tour with Lauryn Hill, Outkast, Cee-Lo Green, The Roots, Jurassic 5, and Erykah Badu. However, following the buzz on "Addictive", Truth Hurts became relatively obscure, only contributing guest vocals to "The Watcher 2" on Jay-Z's Blueprint 2 album and "What" on Eve's Eve-Olution. To date, she remains a one-hit wonder in both America and the UK.  "Addictive" was followed up by a song called "The Truth" written by R. Kelly, with whom she collaborated. The song underperformed on American radio and video outlets. This was likely due in part to the negative press Kelly received over sex-crime allegations, that hit media outlets shortly before the single's release.

Truth Hurts returned in 2004 with her second album, Ready Now, on Raphael Saadiq's Pookie Entertainment label. Its first single, "Ready Now", was released in the summer of 2004. In 2005, Truth Hurts collaborated with J Dilla on Jay Love Japan on the track "Ghetto Love", shortly before his death in February 2006. Truth Hurts is now recording material for her upcoming album and has released a few promo singles via her website. Truth is promoting this material in Europe while touring at various musical venues.

Watson contributed to John Frusciante's 2011 solo album, but her contribution was eventually left off the album.

Discography

Studio albums

Singles
 2002: "Addictive" (featuring Rakim) (US #9, US R&B #2, UK #3, GER #9)
 2002: "The Truth" (featuring R. Kelly) (R&B #47)
 2002: "I'm Not Really Lookin' (featuring DJ Quik)
 2004: "Ready Now"
 2010: "Smoke"
 2015: "Fight 4 Love"
2022: “Cheated”

Guest appearances

References

External links

1971 births
Living people
20th-century African-American women singers
American contemporary R&B singers
Music of St. Louis
Singers from Missouri
Aftermath Entertainment artists
Musicians from St. Louis
21st-century American singers
21st-century American women singers
21st-century African-American women singers